The 1983 World Taekwondo Championships are the 6th edition of the World Taekwondo Championships, and were held in Copenhagen, Denmark from October 20 to October 23, 1983. A total of 353 athletes from 42 nations took part in the championships.

Medal summary

Medal table

References

WTF Medal Winners

External links
WT Official Website

World Championships
World Taekwondo Championships
World Taekwondo Championships
Taekwondo Championships
Taekwondo competitions in Denmark